The Sims 2: Apartment Pets is a video game for the Nintendo DS. EA has described as a follow-up to the Nintendo DS version of The Sims 2: Pets. As in the original, it allows a diverse amount of customization, allowing pets to be created in a variety of colors and sizes.

Story
The game begins with your Uncle Bill going on an expedition and leaving you to take care of the apartment. You can also take care of the pets already in the apartment at the beginning of the game. Soon after the game starts, the janitor will tell you about a lost puppy and give it to you until the owner is found. This pet and more are ones that owners and various people will drop off, asking for you to take care of the pet for a few days.

The Spa
The pet spa is another feature in this game. Owners drop off their pets, and you have a limited time frame where you need to cure any ailments they may have.

Minigames
There are three minigames in The Sims: Apartment Pets. They are: Buried Treasure, Bird Boogie, and the Snake Charming Game.

Reception

The game received "mixed" reviews according to the review aggregation website Metacritic. GamesRadar+ gave it overwhelming dislike a month before it was released Stateside.

References

External links
 

2008 video games
Electronic Arts games
Nintendo DS games
Nintendo DS-only games
The Sims
Life simulation games
Social simulation video games
Video games developed in the United Kingdom
Video games featuring protagonists of selectable gender
Full Fat games
Single-player video games